Burton Park Wanderers Football Club is a football club based in Burton Latimer, Northamptonshire, England.

History
The club was formed in 1961 as Kettering Park Wanderers. They joined Division Two of the United Counties League in 1968, which became Division One in 1972. The club adopted their current name in 1973. After finishing second-from-bottom of Division One in 1977–78, they were relegated to Division Two. However, the division was disbanded two years later and they were returned to Division One. In 1988–89 they were Division One runners-up, earning promotion to the Premier Division. Two seasons later they finished bottom of the Premier Division and were relegated back to Division One.

Burton Park Wanderer remained in Division One for the next thirty seasons, only finishing in the top half on four occasions and finishing bottom of the division in 1988–99, for five consecutive seasons between 2001–02 and 2005–06, and again in 2012–13, 2015–16 and 2016–17. At the end of the 2020–21 season they were transferred to Division One of the Spartan South Midlands League.

Ground
The club initially played at the Rockingham Road Pleasure Park in Kettering before moving to the Pytchley Road pitches elsewhere in the town in the late 1960s. They relocated to Latimer Park in Burton Latimer in 1973.

Records
Best FA Vase performance: Second round 1974–75
Record attendance: 253 vs Rothwell Town, May 1989

References

External links

Football clubs in England
Football clubs in Northamptonshire
1961 establishments in England
Association football clubs established in 1961
United Counties League
Spartan South Midlands Football League